Springfield Secondary School (SPF / SPFSS) is a co-educational government secondary school located in Tampines, Singapore. The school offers the GCE 'O' Level and 'N' Level courses for students from Secondary 1 to Secondary 4/5. It has about 980 students and 90 teachers. 

Springfield has achieved the Sustained Achievement Award in Uniformed Groups twice in 2004 and 2005, as well as the Niche Programme status for rock-climbing in 2008. With the award, Springfield can admit up to 5% of their Secondary One intake through the Direct School Admission (DSA) exercise, in addition to receiving MORE funding. Springfield is also the first secondary school to have student climbers recognized and certified by the UIAA through a training course and expedition.

General
The construction of Springfield Secondary School began in 1992. The school was given the name Tampines West Secondary School. The name "Springfield" was officially adopted on 21 December 1992.

Springfield started functioning in 1993 with eight classes at Tampines Secondary School. It then moved to its present site in 1993 and was officially opened by Yatiman Yusof, Member of Parliament for Tampines GRC, on 15 September 1995.

Sports Climbing programme
Springfield Secondary School built a 15M high outdoor rockwall / climbing wall in 1995, it was one of the first outdoor rockwalls in a secondary school. The rockwall is also used by other education institutions, such as National University of Singapore and Nanyang Technological University and other external organisations such as the Tampines constituency sports club, handicapped organisations such as the visually handicapped, hospital help-groups and the deaf, uniformed group organisations such as the Boys' Brigade, Salvation Army and The Singapore Mountaineering Federation.

The popularity and success of Springfield climbing have produced more than seven national climbers among Springfielders over the last 10 years. Springfield has won four National Championships in the SAFRA National Sports Climbing Championships over the past nine years and successfully mounted a multi-peak expedition to the Himalayas in 2000 and 2008.

A notable Springfielder, Foo Xiu Guan, is doing Singapore proud in the South-East Asian Circuit as well as the World Youth Championships. The school has been successful in competitions in Sports Climbing through its participation in local Sports Climbing events as well as in School-organised events such as "Let's Rock".  

Of special mention is the excellent achievement during the National Schools Sports Climbing Championship 2008 in which Springfield emerged Overall School Champion and the Asian Youth & National School Sport Climbing Championship from 23 to 25 November 2007. In the Asian Youth segment; a Springfielder, Norameera Bte Mohamed Hussein and Muhammad Hafiz B Latiff emerged Champion and 2nd Runner-up in the Speed Climb Category respectively. Springfield were crowned Team Champion in the first ever Speed Team Climbing category in the National School segment.

Advanced Elective Modules
Springfield Secondary School was one of the schools in the pioneering batch to offer Advanced Elective Modules (AEMs). The school will be collaborating with Temasek Polytechnic to offer elective modules to expand the learning experience of pupils and provide exposure to the practice-oriented learning approaches adopted in the polytechnics.

Principals
Lo Sheu Min – 1993 to 1998
Ng Gek Tiang – 1999 to 2004
Tang-Chan Yueh Tarn – 2004 to 2012
Jenny Ng-Loong – 2012 – 2017
 Boey Wai Wah – 2017 - 2018
 Mabel Leong - 2018–2022
 Eleanor Chia - 2023-present

Co-curricular activities 
Sports & Games
Floorball
Netball
Outdoor Pursuit Club/Outdoor Pursuit Club (Rock-Climbing)
Soccer
Taekwondo
badminton 

Uniformed Groups
Boys' Brigade
Girls' Brigade
National Cadet Corps (Land Unit and Sea Unit)
National Police Cadet Corps

Performing Arts
Display/Concert band
Drama Club
Gu Zheng Ensemble
Dance Group
 
Leadership Skills
Student Council

External links

Secondary schools in Singapore
Educational institutions established in 1993
Tampines
1993 establishments in Singapore